Courtemaux is a commune in the Loiret department in north-central France.

See also
 La Mort aux Juifs
 Communes of the Loiret department

References

Communes of Loiret